Špancirfest is a street festival that is held every year since 1999 in Varaždin, Croatia, and lasts for 10 days.

It begins at the end of August, and ends at the beginning of September.  During these days Varazdin regularly hosts over a 100,000 tourists coming from all over Croatia and the surrounding countries. Varazdin's inner ring is turned into an all out entertainment zone.  Concert stages, entertainment zones, shopping kiosks and eateries are erected and street performers, musicians, and all kinds of artists line the streets.

Events 
This Street Festival is made out of several little Festivals:

 Komedija fest (Comedy Fest)
 Hlapec fest (Children plays, for Children under 14 years of age)
 Moderato fest (for lovers of classical music, concerts)
 Jazz festival
 Ritam fest (concerts, a variety of musical expressions)
 Ulica fest (street artists, acrobats, jugglers, street musicians, puppet plays)

The Festival contains about 300 subprograms.

Past Presenters 
Over the last 14 years numerous many well known artist from Croatia, former Yugoslavia and all over the world have participated in the festival such as:

References

External links

 Official website of Špancirfest in Croatian

Recurring events established in 1999
Festivals in Croatia
Varaždin
Street culture
1999 establishments in Croatia